is a train station in Uda, Nara Prefecture, Japan.

Line
Kintetsu Railway
Osaka Line

Layout
Murōguchi-Ōno Station has two opposed side platforms.

Adjacent stations

Railway stations in Japan opened in 1930
Railway stations in Nara Prefecture
Uda, Nara